Gordon Earnest Haines (May 6, 1921 – October 3, 2012) was an American stock car racing driver. He competed in the NASCAR Grand National Division, during 1956.

Career
In addition to his Grand National Series career, Haines also raced in the Winston West Series. He competed in seven Grand National events in his career, earning four top-tens. All of those races came in 1956, when Haines finished 44th in points. Haines was good right out of the gate, finishing three laps down in 9th place at Portland Speedway. Then Haines drove to a career-best 2nd-place effort at Eureka. Mechanical failures left Haines out of the next two races, but then he finished 4th at Sacramento and 9th at San Mateo in his final three races to close out his career, finishing 15th in his final race, at Portland.

He worked at Bi-Rite Motors in Yakima, Washington for many years.

Personal life
Haines was born in Kiester, Minnesota and served in the United States Marine Corps. He died in Yakima, Washington, where he had made his long-time home, on October 3, 2012.

References

External links

1921 births
2012 deaths
Sportspeople from Yakima, Washington
Racing drivers from Washington (state)
NASCAR drivers
People from Faribault County, Minnesota
United States Marines